WEFM (95.9 MHz) is an FM radio station in Michigan City, Indiana, east of the Chicago metropolitan area. It is a member of the Indianapolis Colts affiliates radio network, and the flagship station of the Gary SouthShore RailCats.

References

External links
Official Facebook page

EFM
Michigan City, Indiana
Mainstream adult contemporary radio stations in the United States
Easy listening radio stations
Jazz radio stations in the United States
Radio stations established in 1966
1966 establishments in Indiana